Sogolytics (formerly SoGoSurvey) is a cloud-based SaaS platform that enables creation, distribution and multilingual analysis of surveys, forms, polls, quizzes and assessments. The company was founded in 2013 and is headquartered in Herndon, Virginia, United States.

History
Sogolytics was founded by a team of computer scientists and engineers led by Hamid Farooqui who also is its CEO. Beyond its main location in Herndon, Virginia, the company has offices in Mumbai, India, and Dubai, UAE.

Features 
Sogolytics is a cloud-based SaaS application that can be used to create surveys to measure employee engagement and customer experience, to collect product feedback, and to conduct market research, among other uses. Customers may design surveys from scratch or use a ready-to-use survey template from the pre-loaded survey bank. These surveys can be distributed to the target audience using email invitations, public URLs, social media channels, or SMS. When sufficient responses have been received, users can run real-time reports using Sogolytics’ robust integrated reporting engine. There are a wide variety of reports available, including Bar Graphs, Comparison, Cross Tabs, Individual, and Statistical.

Online research applications
Sogolytics is used by researchers in the corporate world and academia to understand consumer behavior, collect feedback from employees, or conduct academic research projects.

References

External links
 

Software companies based in Virginia
Companies based in Fairfax County, Virginia
American companies established in 2013
Market research companies of the United States
Software companies of the United States